David Henry Jensen (born May 3, 1961 in Minneapolis, Minnesota) is an American former ice hockey player who played in 18 National Hockey League games with the Minnesota North Stars between 1984 and 1986. He is the younger brother of Paul Jensen.

Playing career
Jensen played for the University of Minnesota from 1979 to 1983. He also played for the American national junior team at the 1980 1981 World Junior Championships. He was selected 100th overall in the 1980 NHL Entry Draft by the Minnesota North Stars, Jensen played with the American national team in 1983–84 as an amateur and played in the 1984 Winter Olympics in Sarajevo. He also played at the 1986 World Championships.

He made his NHL debut with Minnesota in 1984, and played 18 games over parts of three seasons. Most of his professional career, which lasted from 1983 to 1990, was spent in the minor leagues. He finished with three seasons in Italy playing for SV Ritten.

Post-playing career
Jensen retired from hockey in 1990 after playing several years in Europe. He is now the Senior Vice President of Touchpoint Media, a custom communications company in Minneapolis that publishes USA Hockey Magazine and Cambria Style among other titles.

Career statistics

Regular season and playoffs

International

References
 
 Profile at hockeydraftcentral.com

1961 births
Living people
American men's ice hockey defensemen
Birmingham South Stars players
Ice hockey people from Minneapolis
Ice hockey players at the 1984 Winter Olympics
Minnesota Golden Gophers men's ice hockey players
Minnesota North Stars draft picks
Minnesota North Stars players
Olympic ice hockey players of the United States
Ritten Sport players
Salt Lake Golden Eagles (CHL) players
Springfield Indians players